The Innocent (Arabic البرئ, pronounced: Alparee') is an Egyptian feature film, released on 15 August 1986, starring Ahmed Zaki, Gamil Ratib, and Mahmoud Abdel Aziz.

Plot 
Ahmed Sabe' El Leil (Ahmed Zaki), a young, struggling farmer, is portrayed in the movie serving his conscription year. As a result of his marksmanship, he is chosen as a prison guard. At the prison, he encounters the political prisoners who are treated inhumanely. He follows orders to torture and humiliate the prisoners, and even perform executions, Trucks full of university students who participated in the 1977 bread riots are brought to this prison, among them is his old friend from the village, Hussein Wahdan. Through Hussein the young guard discovers how oppressive and corrupt the government is, and Ahmed refuses to torture Hussein. In the final scene, censored in Egypt, Ahmed opens fire indiscriminately on officers and fellow soldiers until he is shot as a new truck filled with rioting students arrives.

See also
List of Egyptian films

References

1986 films
Egyptian drama films
1980s Arabic-language films